Ian Derek Francis Ogilvie-Grant, 13th Earl of Seafield (born 1939) is a Scottish peer.

Ogilvie-Grant is the son of Nina Ogilvie-Grant-Studley-Herbert, 12th Countess of Seafield and Derek Herbert Studley-Herbert. As the head of the Seafield family's 84,500-acre estate, he is one of the principal landowners in Scotland. He was a member of the House of Lords from 1969 until the reforms in 1999 removed most hereditary peers, and was affiliated with the Conservative Party.

Ogilvie-Grant married in October 1960, and had two children, James, Lord Reidhaven, and Alexander. He separated from his wife in August 1969, and the couple were divorced on 24 July 1971.

Ogilvie-Grant was one of the largest donors to the successful 'No' campaign in the run-up to the 2014 Scottish independence referendum.

References

1939 births
Living people
Earls of Seafield
Seafield